Michele Pessoa (born 4 January 1963) is an Angolan swimmer. She competed in two events at the 1980 Summer Olympics. She was the first woman to represent Angola at the Olympics.

References

External links
 

1963 births
Living people
Angolan female swimmers
Olympic swimmers of Angola
Swimmers at the 1980 Summer Olympics
Place of birth missing (living people)